The Calgary version of the NWA Canadian Tag Team Championship was established in 1954 as the original top tag team championship in Stampede Wrestling; it held that status until 1959, when the title was abandoned in favor of Stampede's then-newly created International Tag Team Championship.

Title history

Footnotes

References

Canadian Tag Team
Tag team wrestling championships
Canadian professional wrestling championships
Professional wrestling in Alberta